Trachydoras is a genus of fish in the family Doradidae native to South America.

Species
There are currently 6 recognized species in this genus:
 Trachydoras brevis (Kner, 1853)
 Trachydoras gepharti Sabaj Pérez & Arce H., 2017 
 Trachydoras microstomus (C. H. Eigenmann, 1912)
 Trachydoras nattereri (Steindachner, 1881)
 Trachydoras paraguayensis (C. H. Eigenmann & Ward, 1907)
 Trachydoras steindachneri (Perugia, 1897)

References

Doradidae
Fish of South America
Catfish genera
Taxa named by Carl H. Eigenmann
Freshwater fish genera